Duke Zhuang I of Qi (died 731 BC) was from 794 to 731 BC the twelfth recorded ruler of the State of Qi during the Zhou dynasty of ancient China.  His personal name was Lü Gou (呂購), ancestral name Jiang (姜), and Duke Zhuang was his posthumous title.  He was the first of the two Qi rulers called Duke Zhuang.

Reign
Duke Zhuang succeeded his father Duke Cheng of Qi, who died in 795 BC, as ruler of Qi. He had a long reign during an era of upheaval in China. In 771 BC, the Quanrong tribes from the west attacked Haojing, capital of the Zhou dynasty, and killed King You of Zhou. Duke Xiang of the state of Qin sent his army to escort King You's son King Ping of Zhou to the new capital Luoyi, marking the beginning of the Eastern Zhou dynasty. As a reward for Qin's protection King Ping formally granted Duke Xiang of Qin a nobility rank and elevated Qin to the status of a vassal state on par with other major states such as Qi and Jin. Although Qi was little affected by the turmoil as it was located east of the Zhou territory, the state of Qin would from then on grow stronger and eventually conquer Qi in 221 BC and unite China under the Qin dynasty.

Duke Zhuang reigned for 64 years and died in 731 BC. He was succeeded by his son, Duke Xi of Qi.

Family
Wives:
 The mother of Crown Prince Dechen and Zhuang Jiang

Concubines:
 The mother of Prince Lufu and Yi Zhongnian

Sons:
 Crown Prince Dechen
 Served as a Grand Master of Qi
 Prince Lufu (d. 698 BC), ruled as Duke Xi of Qi from 730 to 698 BC
 A son (d. 699 BC) who was the father of Wuzhi, Duke of Qi
 Known as Yi Zhongnian
 Prince Liao, the progenitor of the Xi lineage and the grandfather of Xi Peng
 Served as a Grand Master of Xiyin

Daughters:
 Zhuang Jiang
 Married Duke Zhuang I of Wey (d. 735 BC)

Ancestry

References

Year of birth unknown
Monarchs of Qi (state)
8th-century BC Chinese monarchs
731 BC deaths